Heteroconger tomberua is an eel in the family Congridae (conger/garden eels). It was described by Peter Henry John Castle and John Ernest Randall in 1995. It is a marine, tropical eel which is known from the western central Pacific Ocean, including Fiji and possibly (based on leptocephali) New Caledonia, the Philippines, the Nicobar Islands, Papua New Guinea, and Sri Lanka.

References

tomberua
Taxa named by Peter Henry John Castle
Taxa named by John Ernest Randall
Fish described in 1999